Xavier Cugat (1 January 1900 – 27 October 1990) was a Spanish musician and bandleader who spent his formative years in Havana, Cuba. A trained violinist and arranger, he was a leading figure in the spread of Latin music. In New York City he was the leader of the resident orchestra at the Waldorf–Astoria before and after World War II. He was also a cartoonist and a restaurateur. The personal papers of Xavier Cugat are preserved in the Biblioteca de Catalunya.

Life and career
Cugat was born Francisco de Asís Javier Cugat Mingall de Bru y Deulofeu in Girona, Catalonia, Spain, in 1900 (although he would later claim to have been born in 1901). His family emigrated to Cuba when he was three years old. He studied classical violin and worked as a violinist at the age of nine in a silent movie theater to help pay for his education. He was first chair violinist for the Teatro Nacional Symphonic Orchestra. When he was not performing, he started drawing caricatures. On 6 July 1915 he and his family arrived in New York City on the SS Havana. Cugat appeared in recitals with Enrico Caruso, playing violin solos. 

In the 1920s, he led a band that played often at the Cocoanut Grove, a club in Los Angeles. Cugat's friend, Charlie Chaplin, visited the club to dance the tango, so Cugat added tangos to the band's performances. Seeing how popular the dance was becoming, Cugat convinced the owner to hire South American dancers to give tango lessons. This, too, became popular, and Cugat made the dancers part of his orchestra. In 1928 he turned his act into the film Xavier Cugat and His Gigolos. 

He worked for the Los Angeles Times as a cartoonist. His caricatures were nationally syndicated. They appeared in Photoplay magazine beginning with the November 1927 issue, under the byline "de Bru." His older brother, Francis, was an artist of some note, having painted cover art for F. Scott Fitzgerald's novel The Great Gatsby.

In 1931 Cugat took his band to New York for the 1931 opening of the Waldorf–Astoria hotel. He replaced Jack Denny as leader of the hotel's resident band. For sixteen years, he led the Waldorf–Astoria Orchestra, shuttling between New York and Los Angeles for most of the next 30 years. One of his trademark gestures was to hold a chihuahua while he waved his baton with the other arm.

His music career led to appearing in the films In Gay Madrid (1930), You Were Never Lovelier (1942), Week-End at the Waldorf (1945), Bathing Beauty (1944), Holiday in Mexico (1946), A Date with Judy (1948), On an Island with You (1948), and Chicago Syndicate (1955).

Cugat owned and operated the Mexican restaurant Casa Cugat in West Hollywood. The restaurant was frequented by Hollywood celebrities and featured two singing guitarists who would visit each table and play diners' favorite songs upon request. The restaurant began operations in the 1940s and closed in 1986.

The restaurant's exterior and a fanciful depiction of its interior can be found in scenes in the 1949 film Neptune's Daughter in which Cugat has a substantial role playing himself. A brief scene revolving around the restaurant can also be seen in the earlier 1943 film The Heat's On, also starring Cugat as himself.

Death

Cugat spent his last years in Barcelona, Catalonia, Spain, living in a suite at Hotel Ritz es. He died of heart failure at age 90 in Barcelona and was buried in his native Girona. He was posthumously inducted into the International Latin Music Hall of Fame in 2001.

Marriages
Cugat was married five times. His first marriage was to Rita Montaner (1918–20), his second was to his band vocalist Carmen Castillo (1929–44), his third to actress Lorraine Allen (1947–52), his fourth to singer Abbe Lane (1952–64), and his fifth to Spanish guitarist and comic actress Charo (1966–78).

Recordings

Cugat recorded for Columbia (1940s and 1950s, and Epic), RCA Victor (1930s and 1950s), Mercury (1951–52 and the 1960s), and Decca (1960s). Dinah Shore made her first recordings as a vocalist with Cugat in 1939 and 1940 for RCA Victor. In 1940 his recording of "Perfidia" became a hit. Cugat followed trends closely, making records for the conga, the mambo, the cha-cha-cha, and the twist when these dances were popular. Several songs that he recorded, including "Perfidia", were used in the Wong Kar-wai films Days of Being Wild and 2046. In 1943 "Brazil" was Cugat's most successful chart hit.  It spent seven weeks at No. 2 on the Billboard magazine National Best Selling Retail Records chart behind Harry James's song "I've Heard That Song Before". In the 1950s he made several recordings with his wife, singer Abbe Lane.

His orchestra included Desi Arnaz, Lina Romay, Abbe Lane, Tito Rodriguez, Yma Sumac, Miguelito Valdés, Frank Berardi, Gene Lorello, George Lopez, Glenn E. Brown, Henry Greher, Isabello Marerro, James English, John Haluko, Joseph Gutierrez, Luis Castellanos, Manuel Paxtot, Oswaldo Oliveira, Otto Bolívar, Otto Garcia, Rafael Angelo, Richard Hoffman, Robert De Joseph, and Robert Jones.

Discography
 The Lady in Red (RCA Victor, 1935)
 One, Two, Three, Kick – Congas (Victor, 1941)
 Cugat's Favorite Rhumbas (Columbia, 1945)
 In Santiago, Chile (Tain't Chilly At All) (Columbia], 1948)
 Siesta (Columbia, 1948) 
 Tropical Bouquets (Columbia, 1949)
 Relaxing with Cugat (Columbia, 1952)
 Dancetime with Cugat (RCA Victor, 1953)
 Cugat's Favorite Rhumbas (Columbia, 1954)
 Ole! (Columbia, 1955)
 Mambo at the Waldorf (Columbia, 1955)
 Cha Cha Cha (Columbia, 1955)
 Cugatango! (10" record) (Columbia, 1956)
 Bread, Love and Cha Cha Cha (Columbia, 1957)
 Waltzes but by Cugat! (Columbia, 1957)
 Mambo! (Music for Latin Lovers) (Mercury, 1957)
 The King Plays Some Aces (RCA Victor, 1958)
 Cugat Calvalcade (Columbia, 1958)
 Cugat in Spain (RCA Victor, 1959)
 That Latin Beat! (RCA Victor, 1959)
 Chile Con Cugie (RCA Victor, 1959)
 The Latin Rhythms of Xavier Cugat (Harmony, 1960)
 Cugat in France, Spain, and Italy (RCA Victor, 1960)
 The Best of Cugat (Mercury, 1961)
 Viva Cugat! (Mercury, 1961)
 Twist with Cugat (Mercury, 1962)
 Cugat Plays Continental Hits (Mercury, 1962)
 Most Popular Movie Hits As Styled By Cugat (Mercury, 1962)
 Cugat Plays Continental Hits (Mercury, 1962)
 Cugi's Cocktails (Mercury, 1963)
 Cugat's Golden Goodies (Mercury, 1963)
 Plays the Music of Ernesto Lecuona (Mercury, 1964)

 Midnight Roses (Decca, 1968)
 Cugi's Cocktails (Mercury, 1963)
 Cugat Caricatures (Mercury, 1964)
 The Cugat Touch (Springboard, 1976)

References

External links
 Personal papers of Xavier Cugat, Biblioteca de Catalunya; accessed 8 November 2015
 About Xavier Cugat, 
 Xavier Cugat recordings at the Discography of American Historical Recordings.

1900 births
1990 deaths
People from Girona
Spanish emigrants to Cuba
20th-century Spanish musicians
20th-century violinists
American cartoonists
American people of Catalan descent
Big band bandleaders
Musicians from Catalonia
Cuban emigrants to the United States
Cuban musicians
Cuban people of Catalan descent
Latin jazz bandleaders
Latin jazz musicians
Latin jazz violinists
Rhumba musicians
Columbia Records artists
Mercury Records artists
RCA Victor artists
Los Angeles Times people